Aymeric Jeanneau (born 10 October 1978) is a French professional basketball player. He is a 1.85 m (6 ft 1 in) tall point guard.

Biography
He started his career at Saint-Fulgent before joining the centre of excellence at Cholet Basket. He stayed at Cholet for a long time, under the management of Éric Girard, whom he followed to STB Le Havre and SIG. Jeanneau won the French Championship title with SIG in 2004/2005. Aymeric then had the chance to play in the Euroleague with the Strasbourg team in the 2005/2006 season. At the end of this season, he decided to leave SIG to move to ASVEL where he rejoined Laurent Foirest, his teammate at the 2006 FIBA World Championship in Japan with the French team.

The new Villeurbanne player was then announced as the reserve for Tony Parker for EuroBasket 2007 in Spain. However, a meniscus injury after only a few days into the tournament meant that he missed the rest of the competition.

Honors
 French Championships : 2005, 2009
 Coupe de France : 1998, 1999, 2008
 Match des champions : 2009
 Semaine des As : 2010
 39 caps for France (as of 11/06/2008).
 12th best passer in the history of proA (1172).

External links
Eurocup Profile

1978 births
Living people
People from La Roche-sur-Yon
French men's basketball players
ASVEL Basket players
Cholet Basket players
STB Le Havre players
SIG Basket players
2006 FIBA World Championship players
Sportspeople from Vendée
Point guards